The carte orange (Orange Card) was a pass for the public transportation system in Paris and the surrounding Île-de-France region. A holder of the pass was entitled to unlimited use of the public transit system within a given period of time, with Cartes oranges being available for durations of one week or one month. The carte orange was discontinued in February 2009, and replaced by Navigo semaine (one-week pass) and Navigo mois (one-month pass) on a Navigo card.

The Île-de-France region, with regards to public transportation, is divided in six concentric zones, the first one being the city of Paris. The most basic pass for Paris and its close banlieue covered zones 1–2, costing €17.20 for a one-week pass and €56.60 for a one-month pass.

Description and use
The Carte Orange itself was composed of a subway pass and an identity card, both of which were stored in a small, transparent, flexible plastic folder.

The subway pass — a small, rectangular ticket composed mainly of stiff paper — listed the period of time and the zones for which it was valid, as well as its price. At the top of the front side of the ticket, there was a thin, holographic strip, to prevent counterfeiting. On the reverse side, there was a brown, magnetic strip on which the card's data (zones and dates) were stored. The user fed the Carte orange ticket into a turnstile upon entering a metro station, and the machine, after reading the ticket, returned it to the user. A weekly Carte Orange was valid only for one seven-day period, always starting on Monday and ending on Sunday.

The identity card was an attempt on the part of the public transit authorities to link each Carte Orange to one person, preventing multiple people from sharing one Carte Orange. The identity card featured a space in which the user had to print their full name and, in the lower left-hand corner, a space to which the user had to affix a small, colour photograph of themself. On the back of the card, the user was required to fill out their full address.  A passport-size photo had to be presented when purchasing the Carte Orange, and the ticket office worker affixes the photo to the ID card.  Photo booths are often located near ticket offices.

As an additional security measure, many Paris Métro turnstiles did not accept the same Carte orange ticket more than once in a short lapse of time. In the event that someone accidentally exited a station prematurely (by following the wrong signs, for instance), it may have been necessary to wait (usually only a few minutes) before re-using the ticket. The intention of this mechanism was to prevent multiple passengers from using a single Carte orange to enter an unmonitored metro entrance. 

When using the bus or tramway, the user did not validate their ticket electronically; rather, they showed the driver the identity card and the ticket, who then determined whether or not the Carte Orange was valid for the route.

It was not possible to travel with a Carte Orange beyond the zones that the card was valid, and the transportation authority required the travelers to purchase a ticket valid for the entire trip, regardless of the zones already covered by the carte orange. While some stations have special ticket windows that sold extensions for arriving passengers who needed them (notably for tourists the Versailles station in Zone 4), others do not. This sometimes resulted in a traveller being stuck in the station until they could attract the attention of a metro employee, or jump the turnstile. The Charles de Gaulle Airport RER stop (located in Zone 5) was, unfortunately for tourists, one of those stations that did not have an accessible ticket window on the incoming side.

Security features
The Carte orange had several features intended to make fraud more difficult; the date of each carte's validity was printed in large characters, in 1997 the holographic strip was added, and a new kind of ink was introduced. Before the introduction of these new security features, it was estimated that 2.5% of all Cartes oranges were counterfeit.

History

The Carte orange was launched in 1975, at a time when fare collection for public transit in Paris and the surrounding region was very complicated — in fact, someone wanting to traverse Paris at the time might have had to buy five separate tickets. There had been several attempts to simplify ticketing in the Parisian public transport system in the past. Notably in 1968 a ticket valid for use in the bus and metro, the Ticket ivoire commun (common ivory ticket) was introduced and three years later a ticket valid in the SNCF, buses, metro and cars de banlieue was launched. Nevertheless, the Carte orange was novel in that it was the first ticket that gave the passenger unlimited access to all of the region's public transports for a flat rate, and during a specific period of time.  a one-use ticket can be used in any form of the Paris public transit system.

Initially, the Carte orange was only available to workers, who had to supply proof of employment in order to purchase it. This restriction was soon removed, however, and the Carte became very popular: while transit authorities had estimated that 650,000 Cartes oranges would be sold, within 6 months of its introduction 900,000 were in use. According to Michel Margairaz, a historian of Parisian transports, the gap between these figures can be explained due to a problem in the transit authorities' methodology — they assumed that only those public transit users who would save money with the Carte orange would buy one, but this was not to be the case. Many people were attracted to the idea of using Parisian public transports without worrying about tickets or fares, even if it proved to be more expensive.

Public transit revenues, not only passenger convenience, were central concerns for the Carte's architects: according to Paul Josse, an official involved in the creation of the Carte orange, the new pass "couldn't cost the state or municipal governments a sou." Furthermore, the RATP and the SNCF, respectively responsible for Île de France and national public transit, had to work out a revenue-sharing scheme, but this proved to be relatively easy.

The Carte orange was also intended to boost the use of public transit, then in rapid decline, due to increasing use of cars. In fact, at the end of the 1960s, the transport ministry was actually considering abolishing bus service in Paris. However, within a year of the Carte's introduction, bus usage went up 40%, and more generally, it has been estimated that during the first ten years of its existence, the Carte led to an increase of 20% in the use of Parisian public transport.

Finally, the Carte was intended to make fares more equitable; before the Carte's introduction, those who lived further from the city centre paid much more than more centrally located residents. While it seemed reasonable that those who wanted to travel further should pay more, many people who lived far from downtown Paris had to make many more connections as they travelled compared to others who travelled no further, connections for which they had to pay. The flat-rate system introduced by the Carte changed this.

Phaseout
The Carte orange has been phased out and replaced by the Navigo card. This new card contains a chip and is scanned at turnstiles, carries a photo of the user on the card itself, and may be linked to an account that the user has with the RATP. Thus, unlike the Carte orange, when a Navigo card is lost or stolen, it may be replaced (for a fee). The Carte orange was officially replaced by the Navigo card on May 20, 2008.

The consequence of the phase out of the Carte orange is that it is more expensive for short-term visitors and tourists to take advantage of the maximum discounts available from advance bulk purchase of trips. This is because the Navigo card must either be linked to a French account (available to residents only) or purchased for a €5 fee (Carte Navigo Découverte).

Sources
 Official RATP website

External links
 List of ticket types and prices in Ile de France from Association Multimodale d'Information des voyageurs en Ile de France

Fare collection systems in France
Transport in Île-de-France